The 23rd Lumières Awards ceremony, presented by the Académie des Lumières, took place on 5 February 2018 to honour the best in French films of 2017. The nominations were announced on 11 December 2017.

Winners and nominees

See also
 43rd César Awards
 8th Magritte Awards

References

External links
 
 
 Lumières Awards at AlloCiné

Lumières
Lumières
February 2018 events in France
Lumières Awards